Maine High School may refer to schools in Illinois:

Maine North High School, Des Plaines, opened in 1970 and closed in 1981
Maine South High School, Park Ridge
Maine East High School, Park Ridge
Maine West High School, Park Ridge